Kentucky Route 130 (KY 130) is a  state highway in Union County, Kentucky, United States, that travels from KY 109 and KY 1257 northwest of Sturgis to the Uniontown Ferry on the Ohio River in Uniontown via Morganfield.

Route description

Major intersections

See also

 List of state highways in Kentucky

References

External links

0130
Kentucky Route 130